Hum Tum Aur Mom is a 2005 film.

Cast 
 Mohnish Bahl as Madhav
 Sonali Goswami
 Mushtaq Khan as Pannit
 Tiku Talsania
 Reema Lagoo as Mom
 Krishna Abhishek as Keshav
 Mehr Hassan as Reena
 Ekta Sohini
 Raj Vasudeva
 Tej Sapru as Ashish's father
 Rohini Kapoor
 Shabnam Kapoor

Songs
"Bikhri Zulfein" - Udit Narayan, Alka Yagnik
"Dekha Har Phool" - Babul Supriyo, Rajshree Biswas
"Dil Mera" - Saurabh P. Srinivasan
"Ek Ladki" - Udit Narayan, Sadhana Sargam, Poet: Raees Warsi
"Jaan-E-Chaman" - Saurabh P. Srinivasan, Alka Yagnik
"Mujhko Yoon" - N/A
"Pyar Agar Hai Koi Bhool" - Shreya Ghoshal
"Pyar Ka Taraana" - Saurabh P. Srinivasan, Sadhana Sargam

External links 
 
 
 

2005 films
2000s Hindi-language films